Korkadu is a panchayat village in Nettapakkam Commune in the Union Territory of Puducherry, India. It is also a revenue village under Nettapakkam firka.

Geography
Korkadu is bordered by Sembiapalayam in the west, Mangalam in the north,  Uruvaiyar in the east and Karikalampakkam in the south.

Transport
Korkadu is located at 18 km. from Pondicherry. Korkadu can be reached directly by any bus running between Puducherry - Maducarai or Puducherry- Bahour via Villianur.

Road Network
Korkadu is connected to Pondicherry by Korkadu Erikarai road. This road serves as a link road between Villianur-Bahour road (RC-18) and Mangalam-Maducarai road (RC-19). There is also another link road between RC-18 and RC-19 via Uruvaiyar.

Politics
Korkadu is a part of Embalam (Union Territory Assembly constituency) which comes under Puducherry (Lok Sabha constituency)

References

External links
 Official website of the Government of the Union Territory of Puducherry

Villages in Puducherry district